The Balymer complex is an archaeological complex near the village of Balymer (Балымер), Spassky District, Tatarstan, Russian Federation. 
The former trade emporium on the Volga trade route covers an area of 4 km2. It was first explored in 1870 by A. I. Stoyanov.

The settlement, graves and tumuli belonged to the Volga Bulgars or the Volga Vikings (Rūsiyyah) in the 9th-10th centuries, and to the Golden Horde nomads in the 13th-14th centuries. 
It has been suggested that it was at Balymer that Ibn Fadlan witnessed the funeral of one of the Rus' chieftains (a ship burial involving human sacrifice). 
There is also ample evidence of the Ananyino and Imenkovo cultures, i.e. Finnic peoples.

References 

Спицын А.А. Заметки из поездки 1898,  Известия Императорской археологической комиссии. СПб. 60 (1898).
Жеромский Б.Б. Древнеродовое святилище «Шолом»  Материалы и исследования по археологии СССР. 1958. No. 61; 
Халикова Е.А. Археологические исследования в Куйбышевском районе ТАССР в 1961г.  Краткие сообщения Института археологии АН СССР 104 (1965).

Archaeological sites in Tatarstan
History of Tatarstan
Former populated places in Russia
Cultural heritage monuments of federal significance in Tatarstan